Veszprém KC is a Hungarian handball club from Veszprém, that for sponsorship reasons is called Telekom Veszprém. Veszprém plays in the Hungarian Nemzeti Bajnokság I and are the most successful team in the country, having won the Hungarian Championship a record 26 times and the Hungarian Cup title a record 29 times. Veszprém has also won the regional SEHA League 4 times.

Veszprém are one of the three Hungarian clubs that have won a major European trophy, most recently in 2008, when they overcame Rhein-Neckar Löwen and were crowned as the EHF Cup Winner's Cup champions. They are yet to win the EHF Champions League, having been defeated in the final on four occasions.

The main sponsors of the club were the MKB Bank and the MVM Group. In the summer of 2015, the MKB Bank decided to quit sponsoring after a 10 years interval. Their main focus is now on the younger teams. Currently the main sponsor is Magyar Telekom.

History

In Veszprém there was a long tradition of handball, and in 1970 the Bakony Chemist TC women's team won the first championship among the rural ensembles. The sports club was founded in 1977 under the wing of the Veszprém County State Construction Company (VÁÉV) under the name Of Veszprém Builders, after a political decision was taken in the city, which urged the men's division of BVTC, which had been relegated from NB II, to be taken over by the VÁÉV.

In 1981, under the executive direction of Csaba Hajnal, the new team was promoted to the first division, where it finished each season with a medal; In the first season, he won a silver medal. Over the next three years, they won one silver and two bronze medals in the championship, two silver medals and one gold medal. In 1985 and 1986, the team won the championship.

Over the next four years, the team won only four silver medals (three times at the Rába ETO, 1990–1992 Bramac, Fotex until 2005, MKB until 2015, MVM until 2017, Telekom-backed team since 2017: since 1992, 23 seasons, 20 championship gold and 3 silver medals have been awarded to Veszprém. (Meanwhile, between May 2008 and October 2011, they did not lose a single league game.)

After the success in 1984, 3 Győr victories came, and from 1988 onwards, 19 cup victories in 24 years were added to the list of glory, the brightest result being four KEK finals (2 wins and 2 silver medals) and four EHF Champions League 2nd place.

Since July 2008, Veszprém Aréna has been the home ground for Telekom Veszprém, previously playing their matches in the 15th street hall.

In April 2020, fans voted for the All Star team in club history, which includes Árpád Sterbik, Gergő Iváncsik, Carlos Pérez, József Éles, László Nagy, Mirza Džomba and Andreas Nilsson.

Crest, colours, supporters

Naming history

Kit manufacturers and shirt sponsor
The following table shows in detail Veszprém KC kit manufacturers and shirt sponsors by year:

Kits

Sports Hall information

Name: – Veszprém Aréna
City: – Veszprém
Capacity: – 5096
Address: – 8200 Veszprém, Külső-kádártai út 5.

Team

Current squad
Squad for the 2022–23 season

Goalkeepers
 12  Rodrigo Corrales
 16  Vladimir Cupara 
Left Wingers
 21  Bjarki Már Elísson
 26  Manuel Štrlek
Right Wingers
 24  Gašper Marguč
 55  Mikita Vailupau
Line players
 18  Andreas Nilsson
 46  Dragan Pechmalbec
 88  Adrián Sipos

Left Backs
 23  Patrik Ligetvári
 25  Rasmus Lauge (c)
Central Backs
 27  Péter Lukács
 35  Kentin Mahé
 39  Yehia El-Deraa
Right Backs
5  Yahia Omar 
 29  Nedim Remili
 43  Zoran Ilić

Transfers
Transfers for the 2023–24 season

 Joining
  Hugo Descat (LW) (from  Montpellier HB) 
  Stiven Valencia (LW) (from  Valur) ?
  Sergei Kosorotov (LB) (from  Wisła Płock)
  Agustín Casado (CB) (from  MT Melsungen) 
  Lukas Sandell (RB) (from  Aalborg Håndbold)
  Ludovic Fabregas (P) (from  FC Barcelona)

 Leaving
  Manuel Štrlek (LW) (to  RK Nexe Našice)
  Rasmus Lauge (LB) (to  Bjerringbro-Silkeborg Håndbold)  Kentin Mahé (CB) (to  TSV Hannover-Burgdorf) ?
  Zoran Ilić (RB) (to  HSV Hamburg)  Adrián Sipos (P) (to ?)TransfersTransfers for the 2024–25 season Joining
 

 Leaving
  Vladimir Cupara (GK) (to  Dinamo București) ?

Staff members
  Sports Director: László Nagy
   Head Coach: Momir Ilić
  Assistant Coach: Péter Gulyás
  Goalkeeper Coach: Árpád Sterbik
  Fitness Coach: Srđan Žirojević
  Club Doctor: Tibor Sydó, MD
  Club Doctor: Zsolt Mahunka, MD
  Club Doctor: Péter Szenkovics, MD
  Masseur: József Végh
  Physiotherapist: Nemanja Vučić
  Physiotherapist: Dimitar Manevski

Top scorers

Retired numbers

Honours

Individual awards
 Double
 Winners (18): 1991–92, 1993–94, 1994–95, 1997–98, 1998–99, 2001–02, 2002–03, 2003–04, 2004–05, 2008–09, 2009–10, 2010–11, 2011–12, 2012–13, 2013–14, 2014–15, 2015–16, 2016–17 

Domestic
Nemzeti Bajnokság I Top Scorer

Recent seasons

 Seasons in Nemzeti Bajnokság I: 42
 Seasons in Nemzeti Bajnokság I/B: 1
 Seasons in Nemzeti Bajnokság II: 1

In European competition

 Participations in Champions League (Champions Cup): 27×
 Participations in Cup Winners' Cup (IHF Cup Winners' Cup)'': 10×

EHF ranking

Former club members

Selected former players

  Csaba Bartók (2002–2004)
  Dániel Buday (2003–2007)
  Gábor Császár (2010–2013)
  István Csoknyai (1990–2005)
  József Éles (1990–2003)
  Nándor Fazekas (1998–2004, 2009–2015)
  Gyula Gál (2001–2009)
  István Gulyás (1985–1999)
  Péter Gulyás (2000–2017)
  János Gyurka (1979–1991, 1993–1997)
  Ferenc Ilyés (2007–2009, 2011–2012)
  Gergő Iváncsik (2000–2017)
  Tamás Iváncsik (2007–2014)
  Lajos Keller (1980–1986)
  Balázs Laluska (2010–2014)
  Máté Lékai (2014–2022)
  Richárd Mezei (1997–2001)
  Roland Mikler (2014–2019)
  Tamás Mocsai (2013–2014)
  László Nagy (2012–2019)
  Károly Pardi (1980–1989)
  István Pásztor (1993–2008)
  Jenő Putics (1987–1990)
  Timuzsin Schuch (2011–2018)
  János Szathmári (1995–2001)
  József Végh (1982–1990)
  György Zsigmond (1989–1999, 2001–2005)
   Nikola Eklemović (2004–2011)
   Ivo Díaz (1999–2005)
   Carlos Pérez (1997–2012)
   Árpád Sterbik (2001–2004, 2018–2020)
  Mirsad Terzić (2009–2020)
   Zlatko Saračević (2000–2002)
  Marco Oneto (2012–2013)
  Dalibor Čutura (1998–1999)
  Momir Ilić (2013–2019)
  Ivan Lapčević (2005–2010)
  Petar Nenadić (2018–2023)
  Žarko Šešum (2007–2010)
  Dejan Perić (2006–2011)
  Marko Vujin (2006–2012)
  Mirza Džomba (2001–2004)
  Slavko Goluža (2003–2004)
  Božidar Jović (2000–2003)
  Vlado Šola (2004–2006)
  Marko Kopljar (2016–2017)
  Mirko Alilović (2011–2018)
  Ivan Slišković (2015–2017)
  Renato Sulić (2004–2005, 2009–2018)
  Manuel Štrlek (2018–2023)
  Isaías Guardiola (2016)
  Chema Rodríguez (2012–2017)
  Carlos Ruesga (2013–2015)
  Cristian Ugalde (2012–2018)
  Rodrigo Corrales (2020– )
  Jorge Maqueda (2020–2022)
  Blaž Blagotinšek (2016–2022)
  Dragan Gajić (2016–2020)
  Borut Mačkovšek (2018–2020)
  Gašper Marguč (2014– )
  Tomáš Urban (2012)
  Kiril Lazarov (2002–2007)
  Dejan Manaskov (2017–2022)
  Bjarte Myrhol (2005–2006)
  Kent Robin Tønnesen (2017–2021)
  Rasmus Lauge (2019–2023)
  René Toft Hansen (2018–2019)
  Aron Pálmarsson (2015–2017)
  Bjarki Már Elísson (2022– )
  Yahia Omar (2019– )
  Yehia El-Deraa (2022– )
  Marian Cozma (2006–2009)
  Kentin Mahé (2018– )
  Nedim Remili (2023– )
  Andreas Nilsson (2014– )
  Evgeny Lushnikov (2004–2011)
  Christian Zeitz (2014–2016)
  Mikita Vailupau (2022– )
   Ľubomír Švajlen (1992–1998)
   Žarko Marković (2007–2009)

Notable coaches
  Szilárd Kiss
  Attila Joósz (1991–1995)
  László Kovács (1999–2000)
 Zdravko Zovko (2000–2007)
  Lajos Mocsai (2007–2012)
  Antonio Carlos Ortega (2012–2015)
  Xavi Sabaté (2015–2017)
  Ljubomir Vranjes (2017–2018)
 David Davis (2018–2021)
 Momir Ilic (2021–present)

References

External links
  
 Telekom Veszprém at EHF 

 
Hungarian handball clubs
Handball clubs established in 1977
Veszprém